Drasteria oranensis is a moth of the family Erebidae first described by Rothschild in 1920. It is found from Algeria, to Libya, Egypt, Israel and Saudi Arabia.

There is probably one generation per year. Adults are on wing in from March to September depending on the location.

The larvae feed on Calligonum comosum.

Subspecies
Drasteria oranensis oranensis
Drasteria oranensis arabica Wiltshire, 1990

References

External links

Image

Drasteria
Moths of Africa
Moths of Asia
Moths described in 1920